The Lada Nadezhda or VAZ-2120 "Nadezhda" ("Hope", also a Slavic female name) is a seven-person four-wheel-drive minivan, produced by the Russian automaker AvtoVAZ in 1998-2006.

The VAZ-2120 was the first minivan produced by the Russian auto industry and was based on the VAZ-2131 Niva line of sport utility vehicles. Built in small numbers, it was not met with commercial success and the production dropped down to 1,500 units before it was cancelled in 2006 due to low demand in the Russian market.

The companies Motorica and Super-Avto, two AvtoVAZ subsidiaries located in Tolyatti, produce the Nadezhda on demand.

Modifications 

Series
 VAZ-2120 1.8, with carburetor engine VAZ-2130 (1.8 liter, 80 hp),
 VAZ-2120 1.7i, VAZ-21214 engine  with fuel injection (1.7 liters, 84 hp),
 VAZ-2120M (Lada 2120 1.7i), VAZ-21214 engine with fuel injection (1.7 liters, 84 hp).

Variants
 "Van" ("Utiliter") - commercial retail delivery van
 "Pick-up" - commercial retail delivery truck
 "Service" - mobile workshop
 "Manager" - "office on wheels"
 "Taxi" - 4-seater with a large luggage compartment
 2120M 4 × 2 - restyled rear-drive version with the rear axle derived from the Izh Oda and a turning rear side door

References

External links 

 VAZ-2120 technical specifications

Nadezhda
Cars introduced in 1998
Minivans
Cars of Russia
2000s cars